Smith Hill is a neighborhood in Providence, Rhode Island.  Its traditional bounds are the Woonasquatucket River, the Chad Brown public housing complex, Interstate 95 and West River.

The Roger Williams Medical Center (RWMC) is located in the Smith Hill neighborhood and is adjacent to the VA hospital.

The Rhode Island State House is also located on the border with Downtown. The name 'Smith Hill' is therefore used as a metonym for the Rhode Island state government and the Rhode Island General Assembly.

History 

The neighborhood gets its name from settler John Smith, who set up a grist mill here in 1636, after being banished from England.

Prior to the mid-1800s, the area was considered rural escape from downtown, with few homes. However, in the 1900s industrialization attracted immigrants from Ireland, Eastern Europe and the Balkans to work in nearby mills.

The neighborhood's proximity to the Woonasquatucket and Moshassuck Rivers provided power for the industrial mills.

In the 21st Century, Smith Hill is home to about 6,000 people in a densely populated residential neighborhood.  The location offers easy access to downtown, featuring small parks, a post office, a library branch, and the Harry Kizirian Elementary School. The Smith Hill Partners Initiative (SHPI) plans community events.

Demographics 
The neighborhood is home to whites of European descent and an increasing number of minorities.  As of the 1990 census, Smith Hill was 20% Hispanic, 17.2% Asian and 12.2% black.  The neighborhood's unemployment and poverty rates are above average for the city, though efforts have been made to revitalize the area, although, without success.

Gallery

Related links
Smith Hill Community Development Corporation, neighborhood non-profit dedicated to community building and affordable housing

References

Providence Neighborhoods at Providenceri.com

External links
State Office Building photograph from the Rhode Island State Archives

Neighborhoods in Providence, Rhode Island
Historic districts on the National Register of Historic Places in Rhode Island